Robert Ireland (born 22 July 1900, date of death unknown) was a Scottish footballer who played as a defender.

External links
 LFC History profile

1900 births
Year of death missing
Scottish footballers
Liverpool F.C. players
Rangers F.C. players
Peebles Rovers F.C. players
Clyde F.C. players
St Johnstone F.C. players
Brechin City F.C. players
Workington A.F.C. players
Airdrieonians F.C. (1878) players

Association football defenders